The Thieves' Labyrinth is the third book in a series of four Victorian detective novels by author James McCreet, published in May 2011. It continues the adventures of a set of characters established in the first book, The Incendiary's Trail, namely: George Williamson, Albert Newsome, Noah Dyson, Benjamin and John Cullen.

Plot summary

Following the second instalment of the series, The Vice Society, Inspector Albert Newsome of the Metropolitan Police's Detective Force has been temporarily demoted to the Thames River Police for his insubordination. He can regain his old position only if he proves himself with good behaviour. Meanwhile, his old enemy, George Williamson, is working as a private detective, at the theatres of London, where his job is to catch pickpockets. Both men are highly suspicious of a new face in London: Eldritch Batchem, who claims to be an investigator "By Royal Appointment". When an outrageous theft is made from the city's docks, a competition begins to see who will be the first to solve the crime.

Characters

The main characters are broadly the same as the first two books (The Incendiary's Trail, The Vice Society), with the addition of the curious investigator Eldritch Batchem and a villain known only as "The Italian". As in the previous books, there is constant tension and rivalry between the main characters.

River commerce

The Thieves' Labyrinth is based around the considerable river trade of London in the nineteenth century. As well as Inspector Newsome's duty with the River Police, there are a number of scenes at London Dock and St Katharine's Dock, with details of the global import and export trade, the warehouses, the customs regulations and the various methods of controlling rats. There is also a focus on the sewer system, that emptied into the river before the great drains were built by Joseph Bazalgette, later in the century.

References

2011 British novels
British thriller novels
British historical novels
Novels set in Victorian England
British detective novels
Macmillan Publishers books